Since the inception of Strictly Come Dancing in 2004, several special editions of the show have been transmitted by the BBC each year. These have included seasonal specials, charity specials, and variations of the Strictly Come Dancing format.

Christmas Specials
The Christmas Specials of Strictly Come Dancing have been aired each year since 2004. Between 2004 and 2009, the specials feature celebrities from the current and past series. Between 2010 and 2013 and 2021 onwards, the specials featured celebrities who were unable to compete in the main series due to time constrictions. From 2014 to 2019, the specials again featured contestants from previous series. With their professional dance partners, the celebrities perform their chosen Ballroom or Latin dance which is scored by the judges. The winning couple is then chosen by a studio audience vote.

2004
The first Christmas special was broadcast live on 22 December 2004, featuring top couples from both of the first two series (with the exception of Christopher Parker and Julian Clary, who were not able to appear).  The special was won by Jill Halfpenny and Darren Bennett.

Individual judges scores in the chart below (given in parentheses) are listed in this order from left to right: Craig Revel Horwood, Arlene Phillips, Len Goodman, Bruno Tonioli.

2005
The 2005 Christmas special, broadcast on 24 December, featured the top four couples (Darren Gough and Lilia Kopylova, Colin Jackson and Erin Boag, Zoë Ball and Ian Waite, James Martin and Camilla Dallerup) from that year's series competing against two competitors from the US version, Dancing with the Stars, who danced with two professionals from the British series. The two competitors from the US series were Rachel Hunter, who was teamed with Brendan Cole, and Evander Holyfield, who danced with Karen Hardy. Series 2 winner Jill Halfpenny was scheduled to appear with her partner Darren Bennett, but pulled out due to a breakdown in fee negotiations.

Individual judges' scores in the chart below (given in parentheses) are listed in this order from left to right: Craig Revel Horwood, Arlene Phillips, Len Goodman, Bruno Tonioli.

As well as winning the 2005 series, Darren Gough and Lilia Kopylova won this Christmas Special after receiving the full 40 marks from the judges.

2006
The 2006 Christmas special featured stars from the third and fourth series of Strictly going head to head to perform their highest-scoring dances. The theme of the special was black and white, with all the dancers dressed in white gowns, black dresses and top hats and tails.

It was a pre-recorded show shown on Christmas Day on BBC One.

Individual judges scores in the chart below (given in parentheses) are listed in this order from left to right: Craig Revel Horwood, Arlene Phillips, Len Goodman, Bruno Tonioli.

After the combined scores of the judges' marks and the votes of the studio audience, Colin Jackson and Erin Boag won the competition after getting the full 40 marks from the judges, with Zoë Ball and Ian Waite as runners up. The final places of the bottom four couples were not announced — they were eliminated from the competition in random order.

2007
The 2007 Christmas special featured the top four couples from series five (Alesha Dixon, Matt Di Angelo, Gethin Jones and Letitia Dean), as well as Darren Gough and Mark Ramprakash (champions of series three and four respectively). The winner was series three champion Darren Gough, who received a perfect 40 for his American Smooth and had the highest score overall when the judges' scores were combined with the studio audience vote. Series five semi-finalist Gethin Jones, who also received a perfect 40 for his waltz, was runner-up. The final placing of the bottom four couples was not announced.

It was broadcast on BBC One on Christmas Day (25 December 2007).

Individual judges scores in the chart below (given in parentheses) are listed in this order from left to right: Craig Revel Horwood, Arlene Phillips, Len Goodman, Bruno Tonioli.

Darren Gough won his third Strictly trophy after winning series 3 and two Christmas specials — he and Jill Halfpenny are the only contestants on Strictly to do this.

2008
The 2008 Christmas special aired on 25 December 2008. Tom Chambers, Rachel Stevens and Lisa Snowdon took on former contestants Jill Halfpenny, Alesha Dixon and Kelly Brook. Brian Fortuna partnered Brook due to her original partner, Brendan Cole, dancing with his more recent partner, Lisa Snowdon. Russell Watson made a special guest appearance. The celebrities, their professional partners and their dances were announced on 17 December 2008.

Due to four couples coming top of the leaderboard with 39 points, head judge Len Goodman was given the casting vote to break the tie. Therefore, points from the judges were awarded as follows before the audience vote: Alesha — 6, Jill — 5, Rachel — 4, Kelly — 3, Tom — 2, Lisa — 1. After the audience vote, Halfpenny was named the 2008 Christmas Champion with Brook in second place, meaning that Halfpenny joined Darren Gough in having won two Christmas specials, and her partner Darren Bennett equalled his professional partner and wife Lilia Kopylova's two Christmas special victories.

Individual judges scores in the chart below (given in parentheses) are listed in this order from left to right: Craig Revel Horwood, Arlene Phillips, Len Goodman, Bruno Tonioli.

2009
The 2009 Christmas special aired on 25 December 2009. It featured the top three contestants from series 7 along with former contestants Gethin Jones, Rachel Stevens and Austin Healey. Craig Revel Horwood, Len Goodman, Alesha Dixon and Bruno Tonioli provided the judging. After the audience vote, Ali Bastian and Brian Fortuna were declared champions. Rachel Stevens and Vincent Simone were runners-up.

Individual judges scores in the chart below (given in parentheses) are listed in this order from left to right: Craig Revel Horwood, Len Goodman, Alesha Dixon, Bruno Tonioli.

2010
 Winner

The 2010 Christmas Special aired on 25 December 2010. That special, instead of having celebrities from previous years, had five new celebrities who didn't have time to do the full show.

Individual judges scores in the chart below (given in parentheses) are listed in this order from left to right: Craig Revel Horwood, Len Goodman, Alesha Dixon, Bruno Tonioli.

2011
 Winner

The full lineup of the 2011 Christmas special, once again featuring five new celebrities who could not commit to the full series, was announced on 23 November 2011.

Individual judges scores in the chart below (given in parentheses) are listed in this order from left to right: Craig Revel Horwood, Len Goodman, Alesha Dixon, Bruno Tonioli.

2012
 Winner

The full lineup of the 2012 Christmas special, featuring six new celebrities who could not commit to the full series, was announced on 28 November 2012.

Individual judges scores in the chart below (given in parentheses) are listed in this order from left to right: Craig Revel Horwood, Darcey Bussell, Len Goodman, Bruno Tonioli.

A musical interlude was provided by the popular singer Rod Stewart.

As a new addition to the Christmas specials, a "Strictly Allstar" group of seven previous contestants from the show returned for a group dance, and appearances from Ann Widdecombe and Russell Grant were also in the programme.

Helen Skelton would reappear as part of the main series in Series 20.

2013
 Winner

The full lineup of the 2013 Christmas special, featuring six new celebrities who could not commit to the full series, was announced on 25 November 2013.

Individual judges scores in the chart below (given in parentheses) are listed in this order from left to right: Craig Revel Horwood, Darcey Bussell, Len Goodman, Bruno Tonioli.

Matt Goss would reappear as part of the main series in Series 20.

2014

 Winner

The full lineup of the 2014 Christmas special, featuring six returning contestants in a change to recent tradition, was announced on 13 November 2014.

Most of the celebrities were given new partners, with the exception of Lisa Riley, who was reunited with her original dance partner, Robin Windsor. This year's special had a pantomime theme, with each couple, as well as the judges, dressed as characters from a different classic pantomime.

Individual judges scores in the chart below (given in parentheses) are listed in this order from left to right: Craig Revel Horwood, Darcey Bussell, Len Goodman, Bruno Tonioli.

2015

 Winner

The full lineup of the 2015 Christmas special, featuring six returning contestants, was announced on 19 November 2015. This year's special, like the previous year, had a panto theme.

Individual judges scores in the chart below (given in parentheses) are listed in this order from left to right: Craig Revel Horwood, Darcey Bussell, Len Goodman, Bruno Tonioli.

2016

 Winner

The celebrity lineup of the 2016 Christmas special, featuring six returning contestants, was announced on 7 November 2016. The professional dancers taking part were revealed on 11 November 2016. Each routine had a Christmas movie theme. This year marked the first time a contestant who wasn't one of the final three on Strictly won the Christmas special.

Individual judges scores in the chart below (given in parentheses) are listed in this order from left to right: Craig Revel Horwood, Darcey Bussell, Len Goodman, Bruno Tonioli.

2017

 Winner

The full lineup of the 2017 Christmas special, featuring six returning contestants, was announced on 6 November 2017.

Individual judges scores in the chart below (given in parentheses) are listed in this order from left to right: Craig Revel Horwood, Darcey Bussell, Shirley Ballas, Bruno Tonioli.

2018

 Winner

The full lineup for the 2018 Christmas special was announced on 5 November 2018. The routines were inspired by fairytales and Christmas stories.

Individual judges scores in the chart below (given in parentheses) are listed in this order from left to right: Craig Revel Horwood, Darcey Bussell, Shirley Ballas, Bruno Tonioli.

2019

 Winner

The celebrities taking part in the 2019 Christmas special was announced on 5 November. Their Professional Partners were announced the following week.

Individual judges scores in the chart below (given in parentheses) are listed in this order from left to right: Craig Revel Horwood, Motsi Mabuse, Shirley Ballas, Bruno Tonioli.

2020
Due to the COVID-19 pandemic, no competition was able to take place. Instead, a countdown of the top 25 most memorable dances in Strictly history took place; the 25 dances were selected by a panel before being ranked by the public vote. 2015 champions Jay McGuinness and Aliona Vilani's Week 3 Jive was voted the most memorable dance, with Danny Mac and Oti Mabuse's 2016 Samba finishing second. The Top 25 dances are as follows:

2021

 Winner

The full lineup competing in the 2021 Christmas special was announced on 26 November 2021, featuring six new celebrities for the first time since 2013.

Individual judges scores in the chart below (given in parentheses) are listed in this order from left to right: Craig Revel Horwood, Motsi Mabuse, Shirley Ballas, Anton Du Beke.

2022

 Winner

Individual judges scores in the chart below (given in parentheses) are listed in this order from left to right: Craig Revel Horwood, Motsi Mabuse, Shirley Ballas, Anton Du Beke.

Sport Relief Does Strictly Come Dancing

2008
A Strictly Come Dancing one-off special for Sport Relief was broadcast on 14 March 2008, with Craig Revel Horwood, Arlene Phillips and Len Goodman judging. Five former Strictly contestants related to sport partnered a new celebrity. Jade Johnson and Kara Tointon were contestants on the main show in 2009 and 2010, with Johnson leaving after an injury, and Tointon winning the 2010 title. Their partners on their series were Ian Waite and Artem Chigvintsev.

The results were as follows:

The ranking of the bottom three couples was not announced – they were eliminated from the competition in random order.

A BBC spokesperson commented: "Sport Relief features Strictly Come Dancing with a difference."

2010

2012
Strictly Come Dancing did an underwater special for Sport Relief 2012. The contestants were 2011 champion Harry Judd and runner-up Chelsee Healey. The judges were Len Goodman, Craig Revel Horwood, Bruno Tonioli and Mark Foster. It was presented by Claudia Winkleman.

After the initial scores resulted in a draw, head judge Len had the deciding vote. He chose Chelsee and Pasha, who won the contest.

2014
Strictly Come Dancing did a Paralympians special for Sport Relief 2014. The contestants were David Clarke, Hannah Cockroft, Nathan Stephens and Martine Wright. The judges were Goodman, Tonioli, Darcey Bussell and Lee Pearson; however, no scores were given. The series was presented by Tess Daly.

2018
Strictly Come Dancing did a footballers special for Sport Relief, which aired on 23 March 2018. The special was presented by Ore Oduba, and the judges were Horwood, Bussell, and Tonioli; however, no scores were given. The contestants were Alex Scott, Chris Kamara and David Ginola. Alex Scott, the winner of this special, was later a quarter-finalist in Series 17.

Children in Need

2008
A Strictly Come Dancing one-off special for Children in Need was broadcast on 14 November 2008, with Fearne Cotton presenting and Len Goodman, Bruno Tonioli, Arlene Phillips and Craig Revel Horwood judging.

The results were as follows:

2009
The dancers performed alongside Alesha Dixon singing "The Boy Does Nothing" at the start of the show and also Ricky Whittle was seen backstage, supporting the Hollyoaks cast who performed and Alesha told him to go back to rehearsals. The presenters and judges did not appear in this unlike the previous year when judges rated Terry's performance.

2010
A Strictly Come Dancing one-off special for Children in Need was broadcast on 19 November 2010, with Tess Daly presenting the show and Craig Revel Horwood, Len Goodman, Terry Wogan and Pudsey Bear judging. Harry Judd went on to win the ninth series of the show in 2011.

The results were as follows:

2011
In November 2011, BBC newsreaders Sian Williams, Sophie Raworth, Susanna Reid and Emily Maitlis performed a group dance to Katy Perry's "Firework". Susanna and Robin won with three of the judges' votes. Angela Rippon also made an appearance in the dance, alongside the women. Reid went on to compete as a contestant in the eleventh series of the show in 2013.

2012
A one-off special for Children in Need 2012 was broadcast on 16 November 2012 with Sir Bruce Forsyth and Tess Daly hosting, and judges Craig Revel Horwood, Darcey Bussell, Len Goodman, and Bruno Tonioli. Fan favourites Ann Widdecombe and Russell Grant made a special appearance in a parody of The Queen's Olympic opening ceremony scene with Daniel Craig as James Bond, and danced an "Angels and Demons" routine with their partners Anton du Beke and Flavia Cacace. Bruno voted for Ann and Anton, but Craig, Darcey, and Len all chose Russell and Flavia, who took home the Pudsey-on-a-glitter-ball trophy.

2013
A one-off special was broadcast for Children in Need 2013 on 15 November 2013. Sir Bruce Forsyth and Tess Daly hosted the show, and was judged by Len Goodman, Darcey Bussell and Bruno Tonioli. The show featured professional ice skaters Jayne Torvill and Christopher Dean, who were partnered with James Jordan and Aliona Vilani. Bussell voted for Chris and Aliona, but Tonioli and Goodman voted for Jayne and James, who won the show and took home the Pudsey-on-a-glitter-ball trophy.

2014

The judges were Horwood, Bussell, Goodman and Tonioli. There were two teams, each consisting of two children and two of the show's professional dancers. Team Glitter's pros were Natalie Lowe and Anton Du Beke; Team Sparkle's pros were Aliona Vilani and Tristan MacManus. Team Glitter took home the trophy.

2015

On 13 August 2015, it was announced that Call the Midwife actors Jenny Agutter, Laura Main, Stephen McGann and Jack Ashton would appear on the 2015 Children in Need special. Tess Daly hosted the show, along with former presenter Sir Bruce Forsyth in what was Forsyth's final formal television appearance prior to his death in 2017.

2016

On 18 November 2016, British Olympians Canoeist Joe Clarke, Hockey player Hollie Webb, Taekwando athlete, Lutalo Muhammad and Rower Helen Glover competed in the 2016 Children in Need Special. Tess Daly and Claudia Winkleman presented the show, making it the first Children in Need not co-presented by Sir Bruce Forsyth.

2017
The BBC announced that former and current Blue Peter presenters would take part in the 2017 special.

2018
The BBC announced that the current members of Boyzone would take part in the 2018 special.

2019
It was announced on 28 October that four current EastEnders actors would take part in the 2019 special. The lineup included Louisa Lytton, who had previously reached the quarter-finals of the main show in 2006, and was won by Maisie Smith, who would go on to reach the final of the main show in Series 18.

2020
Because of the COVID-19 pandemic, no competition was able to take place. Instead, the special featured a compilation of clips of members of the public and the cast of the current series of the show, dancing to the song "Shut Up and Dance" by Walk the Moon. At the end of the compilation, all three* judges were each seen giving a score of 10.

Other specials

Strictly Ice Dancing (2004)
Strictly Ice Dancing was broadcast as a one-off special on 26 December 2004; with Carol Smillie, Jessica Taylor, Scarlett Alice Johnson, Marcus Patric, David Seaman, and Rowland Rivron paired with professional skaters. This was won by David Seaman (who was a late replacement for Paul Gascoigne) and his partner Zoia Birmingham. Carol Smillie, a contestant on Strictly Ice Dancing, was a series 4 contestant, this time, dancing with Matthew Cutler.

In order of elimination, the competitors were:

Strictly Ice Dancing was identical to the ITV format Dancing on Ice, although details of Dancing on Ice were revealed before Strictly Ice Dancing was commissioned.

Strictly African Dancing (2005)
A further one-off special was broadcast on BBC One on 9 July 2005 as part of the BBC's Africa Lives season. It featured six celebrities of African descent performing traditional African dances with a professional troupe. The contestants were Tunde Baiyewu, Tupele Dorgu, Robbie Earle, Antonia Okonma, Louis Emerick, and Tessa Sanderson. The programme was presented by Natasha Kaplinsky and Martin Offiah, and the winner was Robbie Earle. Professional dancers Darren Bennett and Lilia Kopylova, who have appeared on Strictly Come Dancing since the second series, also appeared on this special to perform a traditional African Samba.

In order of elimination:
Tunde Baiyewu
Louis Emerick
Tupele Dorgu
Tessa Sanderson
Antonia Okonma
Robbie Earle

The London cast of the musical The Lion King, led by South-African actress Brown Lindiwe Mkhize, took part in this broadcast. The company performed the trademark song "Circle of Life".

The Weakest Link

2008
On 27 December 2008, a special episode of The Weakest Link was broadcast on BBC One featuring participants of Strictly Come Dancing. The game was won by series 6 celebrity Mark Foster, who beat professional dancer Anton du Beke in the final. Participants in order of elimination were:

 The contestant was statistically the strongest link. 
 The contestant was statistically the weakest link.

2021
On 18 December 2021, The Weakest Link returned for a Strictly special as the first show in a revived series on BBC One with new host Romesh Ranganathan,  it had a special 13 years ago previously. The contestants were: Clara Amfo, Dr. Ranj Singh, Catherine Tyldesley, Anton Du Beke, Janette Manrara, Hrvy, Emma Barton and Ore Oduba.

 The contestant was statistically the strongest link. 
 The contestant was statistically the weakest link.

2022

On 17 December 2022, The Weakest Link returned for another Strictly special. It included professional dancers Amy Dowden, Kai Widdrington, Karen Hauer and Joanne Clifton, and former celebrity contestants Max George, Dan Walker, Jayde Adams and Rhys Stephenson.

 The contestant was statistically the strongest link. 
 The contestant was statistically the weakest link.

The People's Strictly for Comic Relief (2015)
On 11 September 2014, the BBC announced that a special non-celebrity version of the show would air for Comic Relief 2015. It featured six inspirational heroes who underwent four weeks of training before performing live in the studio.

The series began airing on 25 February 2015 over four pre-recorded episodes, the first two episodes introduced the contestants, the third episode on 5 March followed their training and preparation for the show. The fourth episode on 11 March saw the couples take to the dance floor, with the winner decided via an online public vote and announced live on Red Nose Day 2015 on 13 March.

The series was hosted by Tess Daly and Claudia Winkleman, and judged by Darcey Bussell, Bruno Tonioli and Len Goodman alongside guest judge Anton du Beke. Craig Revel Horwood did not take part as a judge due to prior commitments. The judges' scores were for guidance only.

Individual judges scores in the chart below (given in parentheses) are listed in this order from left to right: Anton du Beke, Darcey Bussell, Len Goodman, Bruno Tonioli.

References

Strictly Come Dancing